Bra mennesker is a 1937 Norwegian drama film directed by Leif Sinding, and starring Sonja Wigert, Georg Løkkeberg and Harald Steen. The script was also written by Sinding, based on a play by Oskar Braaten. The film was produced at A/S Merkur-Film and features music by Willy Vieth.

References

External links
 
 Bra mennesker at Filmweb.no (Norwegian)

1937 films
1937 drama films
Films directed by Leif Sinding
Norwegian black-and-white films
Norwegian drama films
1930s Norwegian-language films